Monte Orsiera is a mountain in the Cottian Alps belonging to the Province of Turin (Italy).

Etymology 
The English translation of Monte Orsiera can be Mountain of the  bears, an animal which in Piedmont became extinct between the end of 18th century and the beginning of 19th century.

Geography 
Mount Orsiera is the highest mountain of the long ridge which, starting from Sestriere, divides the Susa Valley from the Chisone valley.

SOIUSA classification 
According to SOIUSA (International Standardized Mountain Subdivision of the Alps) the mountain can be classified in the following way:
 main part = Western Alps
 major sector = North Western Alps
 section = Cottian Alps
 subsection = Alpi del Monginevro
 supergroup = Catena Bucie-Grand Queyron-Orsiera
 group = Gruppo dell'Orsiera
 subgroup = Costiera Orsiera-Rocciavrè
 code = I/A-4.II-A.3.b

Nature conservation 
The mountain and its surrounding area are included in a regional nature park called Parco naturale Orsiera - Rocciavrè, which also is the SIC (Site of Community Importance) of code IT1110006.

References

Maps
 Italian official cartography (Istituto Geografico Militare - IGM); on-line version: www.pcn.minambiente.it
 Istituto Geografico Centrale - Carta dei sentieri e dei rifugi scala 1:50.000 n. 1 Valli di Susa Chisone e Germanasca

External links 
 Monte Orsiera punta nord: 360° panoramic image from the summit on pano.ica-net.it

Two-thousanders of Italy
Mountains of Piedmont
Mountains of the Alps
Metropolitan City of Turin